The Grand Howl is a ceremony used by Cub Scouts and Brownies. It was devised by Robert Baden-Powell, the author of the scouting guide Scouting for Boys, and is based on the Mowgli stories in Rudyard Kipling's Jungle Book. In the ceremony, Cubs act out the wolves greeting Akela, the "Old Wolf", at the Council Rock and are reminded of the Cub Scout Promise. Baden-Powell also created a Grand Howl for Brownie Guides, which was in imitation of an owl instead of a wolf. It has been used as an opening and closing ceremony as well as a method of conveying thanks or appreciation by all sections of Scouting.

Origin

In the wild, wolves howl to assemble the pack usually before and after hunts, to pass on an alarm particularly at a den site, to locate each other during a storm or while crossing unfamiliar territory, and to communicate across great distances. Grand howls had been part of social occasions since at least the 1850s.

Five years after the founding of the Scout movement, Baden-Powell and others worked on a scheme for those who were too young to join the Boy Scouts at the age of 11, initially called "Junior Scouts". By the time of the launch of the scheme, Baden-Powell had obtained the approval of his friend and neighbor, Rudyard Kipling, to use the Jungle Book as a theme. Under the name of "Wolf Cubs", the 8- to 10-year-old boys would take part in basic versions of the activities enjoyed by the older Boy Scouts, but within a background of the jungle in the Mowgli stories of Kipling's 1898 book. The Cubs would act out scenes from the stories, and the adult leaders would adopt the names of characters from the book. For example, the leader in charge would be titled Akela, after the character Akela who led the titular Mowgli's wolf pack in Kipling's novel.

Baden-Powell book, entitled The Wolf Cub's Handbook, was published on 2 December 1916. In the first chapter, he describes the following scene in The Jungle Book and provides some additional context for the Grand Howl ceremony:

Original Grand Howl

The original instructions for the Grand Howl, described by Vera Barclay and Baden-Powell in The Wolf Cub's Handbook.
Scouter: "Pack - Pack - Pack!" This calls the Cubs into a Parade Circle.
The Cubs reply as they run to their places in the circle.
Cubs: "Pack!"
As the Scouter enters the circle, the Cubs squat down on their heels with their "fore paws" on the ground between their feet and their knees out on either side.
Cubs: "Ah-kay-la! We-e-e-e-ll do-o-o-o o-o-o-u-u-r BEST!" On the word "BEST", the Cubs jump to their feet with two fingers of each hand at the sides of their heads, to resemble a wolf's ears.
A Sixer: "Dyb - dyb - dyb -dyb" The word "dyb" means "Do Your Best"
circle around leader DYB DYB DOB which is the first part of the Cub Promise and was the original Wolf Cub motto.
On the fourth "dyb", the Cubs lower their left hands and the fingers of their right hands extend to form the Wolf Cub salute.
Cubs: "We-e-e-e-ll dob-dob-dob-dob", meaning "We'll do our best".

National variants

United Kingdom
In 1966, a complete review of the UK Scout Association, The Chief Scouts' Advance Party Report, recommended that less emphasis be placed on the Jungle Book for Wolf Cubs, who were to be renamed Cub Scouts. Although the Grand Howl was to be retained, it was revised, replacing the "dybs" with plain language to "make the significance clearer to parents and public". The recommendations were accepted and began to be implemented in October 1966. The revised Grand Howl is as follows:
Pack in circle.
Cub Scout Leader in centre, arms outstretched facing Sixer;
Cub Scout Leader arms down;
Pack squats.
Pack: "Akela! We'll do our best".
Sixer: "Cubs! Do your best".
Cubs: "We will do our best", giving the Scout salute (which had replaced the two-finger salute in the Cub Section).

Following a further programme review between 2000 and 2002, the Grand Howl became optional, allowing Packs to adopt themes other than the Jungle Book - although local groups had always adapted the ceremony.

The independent Baden-Powell Scouts' Association and British Boy Scouts and British Girl Scouts Association continue with the original Grand Howl.

United States
The Cub Scout programme of the Boy Scouts of America and Brownies of the Girl Scouts of the USA have used the traditional Grand Howl as a "special recognition ceremony" with the person being honoured (a guest, parent or member of the Pack), standing in the centre of the circle. In addition, a Short Grand Howl can be used as follows:

Canada
The Cub Scouts of Scouts Canada use the traditional Grand Howl. The following version is used in French speaking Packs:

Australia
The Grand Howl used by the Cub Scouts of Scouts Australia is as follows:

New Zealand
The Grand Howl used by the Cubs of Scouts New Zealand is identical to the version currently used in the United Kingdom.

Brownies
A junior section of Girl Guides started in 1914 in the United Kingdom, under the name of "Rosebuds"; this name was disliked by girls and it was soon amended to Brownies, being themed on the story by Juliana Ewing. In Baden-Powell's 1918 book, "Girl Guiding: A Handbook for Brownies, Guides and Rangers", the Grand Howl is described as "the grandest salute a Pack (of Brownies) can give, and is only for very special occasions". Baden-Powell describes how the Brownies should begin in a squatting position, in the same way as the Cub equivalent, but repeating "Tu-whit, tu-whit, Tu-whoo-oo" three times, each time getting louder and rising higher, until at the end of the third repetition, the Brownies were to jump in the air and clap their hands above their heads.

In the United Kingdom, the 1966 report called Tomorrow's Guide by a Working Party set up to revise and update the programme of the Girl Guides Association, recommended a reduction in the number of ceremonies used by Brownies; the Grand Howl was not retained. The Brownie Grand Howl is still used by the Girl Guides of Canada.

Cultural impact
A Wolf Cub Grand Howl takes place in George Orwell's A Clergyman's Daughter.

See also
Campfire ash ceremony

References

Bibliography

External links
Instructional video of the Grand Howl by The Scout Association (United Kingdom) 

Scouting events
Squatting position